John Anthony O'Neill (born 1951) is an Australian sporting administrator and businessman. He has been involved with both rugby union and soccer at the national level, after being head of the State Bank of New South Wales.

Former CEO of the Australian Rugby Union, instrumental in staging the 2003 Rugby World Cup. In 2004, O'Neill was appointed head of the newly created Football Federation Australia by chairman Frank Lowy, a position he remained in until 7 November 2006. He then returned to his former position as CEO of the ARU.

ARU chief executive - 1995-2003 

O'Neill held the position as chief executive of Australian Rugby Union between 1995 and 2003.

The 2003 Rugby World Cup was originally scheduled to be hosted by Australia and New Zealand. However, in April 2002, the International Rugby Board decided that Australia would be the sole host of the tournament after the Australian Rugby Union (ARU), led by O'Neill, made a proposal to that effect. Upon visiting New Zealand, with the country upset with this decision, O'Neill described himself as "surprisingly well recognised" and that he "walked through the crowd at Eden Park at one point and that was an adventure. I used that old Paul Keating bit of advice 'don't make eye contact'." He said further that he is "probably a better known face there (N.Z.) than I am here (Australia), which is terrifying."

Prior to the 2003 Rugby World Cup, after the International Rugby Board decided that "no formal musical performance will be permitted other than the playing of the national anthems", O'Neill described the decision not to allow the singing of "Waltzing Matilda" as a "half-pregnant situation where you can sing it but not when the players are on the paddock." He attracted much media attention with the statement, even starting a media campaign which included Sally Loane and Alan Jones. John Howard even suggested that "it's ridiculous".

O'Neill was credited with the successful organisation of the 2003 Rugby Union World Cup which made the ARU a profit of over $30 million. O'Neill was named Sport Executive of the Year 2003. O'Neill left the ARU just after the World Cup. ending his contract a year early. He was described as "flamboyant" by Tim Glover, a journalist .

In December 2003, O'Neill announced that he would not seek a renewal of his contract with the ARU. Andrew Stevenson, a journalist for the Sydney Morning Herald'''s Rugby Union website "Rugby Heaven", described the decision as having been reached at a board meeting with the ARU.

O'Neill "decided to move on earlier", as the rugby.com.au website described it, from the ARU in January 2004, instead of the end of his contract in December 2004. O'Neill described his decision thus "I said during the Tournament that I would take a family holiday and think about my future over the Christmas, New Year period. Since then, I have had the chance to reflect on the Tournament and its acclaimed success and my eight fruitful years at the helm and have decided that now is the best time for Australian Rugby (Union) and me to move on with Rugby (Union) at such a high point."

Bob Tuckey, chairman of the ARU said "On behalf of the Board I would like to thank John for the outstanding contribution he has made to Rugby (Union). We have just staged the best ever Rugby (Union) World Cup and John will leave the game with a much enhanced profile and a significant supporter base." O'Neill himself said "The Board and I have accordingly agreed to bring forward my departure. The ARU and Rugby are in great shape with excellent people and a very bright future."

In 2004, he defended the ARU over an argument between it and the New South Wales Rugby Union over rugby league footballer Andrew Johns.

Journalist Spiro Zavos wrote in his weekly column with the Sydney Morning Herald'' arguing for the return of John O'Neill to the ARU in 2006.

Soccer - 2003-2006

Within a week of leaving the ARU, O'Neill was appointed chief executive of by what is now Football Australia to help reorganise its game. The Australian Soccer Association had at that point debts of over A$16 million a year and its national competition had an average attendance of little more than 4,000. Its previous administration was overturned with Frank Lowy taking over the reins to create a new national football competition. An early move by John O'Neill was to change the name of the organisation to Football Federation Australia.

O'Neill was instrumental in creating a much higher profile for soccer.  O'Neill oversaw the introduction of the A-League which reduced the number of teams in the national competition to eight, representing the economically sound regions of Sydney, Melbourne, Brisbane, Perth, Adelaide, Newcastle, New Zealand and the Central Coast of New South Wales. The first year of the A-League saw the competition average over 10,000 per game and the grand final sold out at Sydney Football Stadium in Sydney.

Nationally, O'Neill had guaranteed Australia coach Frank Farina's job to the World Cup, but after a poor Confederations Cup campaign he sacked Farina and was instrumental in securing Guus Hiddink as the national team coach. Under Hiddink's guidance, Australia did better than expected, not only qualifying for the 2006 FIFA World Cup, but finishing second in group F to progress to the round on 16.  Australia was knocked out after contentiously losing to Italy, the eventual world cup winners.

On 29 August 2006, O'Neill announced his decision not to seek a renewal of his contract, which was expiring in the following March. This was despite the fact that less than two years earlier he had said "I would not want to leave unfinished business, so I would be looking at least five years". Citing personal reasons for his decision to step down, despite rumours in the media that there was tension between O'Neill and Lowy, he described his involvement with soccer as "an exhilarating ride and while we’ve achieved so much, the potential to take the game even further is enormous". FFA chairman Frank Lowy said "John established the foundation for 'New Football' and he's achieved tremendous success during the past three years,". O'Neill was eventually replaced by Australian Businessman and former Australian rules footballer Ben Buckley.

ARU chief executive - 2007 - 2013 
O'Neill was appointed Australian Rugby Union Managing Director and CEO in 2007.

It was reported that in 2010 O'Neill proposed structural changes about how the game was governed and financially managed after reporting on the precarious financial state of the game to the Board (in the three years he had spent at the Football Federation Australia, the ARU had $18 million less than when he had left). He advised the board to follow the centralised model of New Zealand, where head office would control 'players' performance, coaching and medical science across all Wallabies and Super Rugby teams' in Australia, although agreed by the board initially, six weeks later they retracted the plan due to criticism from the major states (NSW, Victoria and Queensland). The centralised model has shown great success for New Zealand since adoption with back to back world cup wins and multiple Super Rugby titles (Highlanders, Chiefs and Hurricanes).

On 31 October 2012 O'Neill left his positions in Australian Rugby. ARU Chairman Michael Hawker said under O’Neill's leadership: "Qantas Wallabies have improved from fifth in the world when John returned to the game in 2007 to now second behind the All Blacks, participation levels are at an all-time high, and the ARU has strengthened its financial position."

He remained a board member (in personal capacity) of Rugby World Cup Ltd until 2016.

Corporate directorships
O'Neill held non-executive directorships on a number of public company boards. He was a director of Tabcorp and Amalgamated Holdings and chairman of Events New South Wales, Star Entertainment Group and Queensland Airports.

Recognition
 2002 & 2003 - Australian Sport Awards Sport Executive of the Year
 2004 - Officer of the Order of Australia for service to rugby as an administrator, to the financial services sector, and to the community through educational and charitable organisations.
 2005 - Awarded the French decoration of the Chevalier de la Legion d’Honne. for "the important role he has played in the fostering of relations between France and Australia, particularly in the field of sport".
 2015 - Sport Australia Hall of Fame general member inductee.

References

Australian sports executives and administrators
Rugby union people in Australia
People educated at St Joseph's College, Hunters Hill
Australian chief executives
Football Australia officials
Sport Australia Hall of Fame inductees
Australian casino industry businesspeople
1951 births
Living people
State Bank of New South Wales